This page provides the summaries of the OFC Second Round matches for 1990 FIFA World Cup qualification.

Format
In this round Israel who was awarded a bye into the Second Round played Australia and New Zealand who won in the First Round.

The winners advanced to the play-off against the CONMEBOL group winners with the weakest record.

Standings

Matches

See also
1990 FIFA World Cup qualification (CONMEBOL–OFC play-off)
1990 FIFA World Cup qualification (OFC)

External links

2
FIFA World Cup